Nuclear Holiday is a live album by UK rock band 3 Colours Red.

It was recorded at the Islington Academy in London, England, on 6 February 2004 for a live D.V.D. (Live at the Islington Academy) by Secret/Snapper Records. The audio was later released and titled Nuclear Holiday.

Track listing
 Repeat To Fade  
 This Is My Hollywood  
 Paranoid People  
 Pure  
 Fit Boy And Faint Girl  
 Mental Blocks  
 World Is Yours  
 Sunny In England  
 Copper Girl  
 Nerve Gas  
 God Shaped Hole  
 Sixty Mile Smile  
 Hateslick  
 Paralyse  
 Beautiful Day  
 Nuclear Holiday

Personnel
 Pete Vuckovic - vocals/bass
 Chris McCormack - guitar/vocals
 Paul Grant - guitar/vocals
 Keith Baxter - drums

References

3 Colours Red albums
2004 live albums